Gopo's Little Man (Romanian: Omuleṭul lui Gopo) is a humanoid character that appears in most of Ion Popescu-Gopo's animation films.

History and symbolism
The Little Man first appears in A Brief History (1956), an animation film telling the story of the Universe and humankind from an evolutionary perspective. The trepidations caused by a dinosaur made a monkey fall off a tree and break its tail. The monkey then got off the ground under the appearance of The Little Man, who is then shown climbing a ladder. As he climbs, he successively turns into an Egyptian, a Greek, a Roman, a medieval knight, a Victorian gentleman, and a modern man.

The Little Man explores the deep seas and then flies to space in a rocket (anticipating Yuri Gagarin's spaceflight by five years).

The worldwide success achieved by A Brief History turned The Little Man into an iconic character, symbolizing the human race in its quest for knowledge and beauty. Ion Popescu-Gopo was going to use it in another seven films. In many situations, The Little Man is shown holding a flower to his heart, which is taken to symbolize the humans' capacity and need for love.

Filmography

 A Brief History (1956)
 Seven Arts (1958)
 Homo Sapiens (1960)
 Allo Hallo    (1962)
 Ecce Homo     (1977)
 Three Apples  (1979)
 Quo Vadis, Homo Sapiens? (1982)
 Homo Faber (1986)

Awards
 Palme d'Or in the Cannes Film Festival for A Brief History (1957)
 The Grand Prize for the Best Animation Film in the Tours Film Festival (France) for Seven Arts (1958)
 The Golden Gate Award of the San Francisco Film Festival for Homo Sapiens (1960)

The Little Man statuette
Romanian artist Adrian Ilfoveanu was commissioned to create the trophy for the Gopo Awards, whose first edition in 2007 was also thought as a tribute to the 50th anniversary of A Brief History''s victory at Cannes. Gopo's Little Man was chosen as a model. Although the Gopo Awards were recently established, the statuette entered popular culture, so that Romanian cinematic artists talk about receiving one or more "Little Men."

See also
 Ion Popescu-Gopo
 Gopo Awards

References

External links
 http://agenda.liternet.ro/articol/7486/Marian-Tutui/Portret-Ion-Popescu-Gopo.html

Cinema of Romania
Fictional prehistoric characters
Fictional scientists
Fictional artists
Fictional Romanian people